Iris West is a fictional character, a supporting character appearing in American comic books published by DC Comics. She has been the main love interest and later wife of Barry Allen, the alter ego of the Silver Age version of the superhero The Flash, and the aunt and grandmother, respectively, of the Modern Age variations of the characters Wally West and Bart Allen.

On television, she has appeared in various adaptations in other media; the character has been portrayed by Paula Marshall in the 1990 CBS television series and by Candice Patton in the 2014 The CW television series along with appearances in other Arrowverse shows. In the DC Extended Universe feature films, she is portrayed by Kiersey Clemons in Zack Snyder's Justice League (2021) and The Flash (2023).

Publication history
Created by Robert Kanigher and Carmine Infantino, the character made her first appearance in Showcase #4 (October 1956).

Fictional character biography
Iris West works as a reporter for Picture News, based in Central City, and is the fiancée of Barry Allen, who is secretly the Flash. Prior to Barry becoming the Flash, Iris often chides Barry for his frequently being late due to his repeatedly being lost in thought at work as a forensic scientist, a tendency which continues even after he becomes a high-speed superhero. When Iris and Barry marry, Iris learns that, not only is Barry the city's heroic speedster, but her nephew, Wally West, is Kid Flash. She is not told by Barry, but discovers her husband's secret on their wedding night when Barry talks in his sleep. She reveals this to him on their first wedding anniversary. During this time, the couple discovers that Iris was born in the 30th century.

After years as a prominent presence in the Flash's life and in Central City, She was killed by Professor Zoom during a costume party. Zoom vibrated his hand into Iris’s head, solidifying it just enough to kill her. Years later, Barry killed Zoom while trying to prevent him from murdering his new fiancée, Fiona Webb. However, Iris did not stay dead for long as Iris' biological parents, the Russells (with the help of a future Flash, John Fox), sent then-infant Iris to the past, where she was adopted by Ira West, her "death" causing a paradox that was resolved after the Russells placed her consciousness into a new body. Barry is reunited with Iris in her time, however, the couple knows that if Barry returns to the past, he will die in the Crisis on Infinite Earths. They are able to spend a month together in the 30th century, until Barry is kidnapped by the Anti-Monitor and returns to 1985.

During their time in the future, they conceive the Tornado Twins, Don and Dawn. Don marries the descendant of Professor Zoom, Meloni Thawne, hoping to end the feud between the two families. They have a son, Bart, whose powers manifest at an early age and cause him to age at an accelerated rate. Dawn marries Jeven Ognats of Aarok and has a daughter, Jenni. Her powers eventually manifest when she witnesses her father being tortured, and she becomes XS of the Legion of Super-Heroes. Don and Dawn die saving 30th century Earth from an invasion by the Dominators.

Iris takes Bart to the past to enlist the aid of her nephew (by then, Wally had taken the mantle of the Flash) in saving her grandson. After Bart's accelerated aging slows down, he takes the name of Impulse. Iris disappears for a while, feeling out of place in the 20th century. She contacted Johnny Quick at a country diner and tried to warn him of his upcoming battle with Savitar, but he did not heed her. Afraid to change the future by giving vital information about the present, Iris refused to go into the details of how Savitar could be defeated, but finally Linda Park and Jenni Ognats convinced her to tell them the key to Savitar's defeat, which was to give him what he wanted: to be one with the Speed Force. 

Iris again disappeared. This time she is kidnapped by Polaris and Abra Kadabra and forced to write everything she knew about the future so that they could have a "roadmap into tomorrow" for their plan of world conquest. 

After this incident, Iris went someplace where no one would find her so that she could concentrate on writing the book The Life Story of the Flash, which was published by Keystone Press in 1997.

Some time later, Iris returns to adopt the child of Wally's ex-girlfriend, officer Julie Jackman, upon her death, having befriended the girl during her time in the present. While in the future, Iris learnt that the child, Josh Jackman, was destined to become a great hero and was believed to be Wally's illegitimate child; however, it turns out that in reality, the child is Mark Mardon's, who had a one-night-stand with Julie after Wally dumped her. Realizing that what was told in the future was wrong, Iris decided to come out of hiding and reconnect with her grandson and nephew.

One Year Later

A mysterious hooded figure enlists the help of Zoom to attack Bart while he confronts Captain Cold, and later reveals herself as Iris. Her plan is to somehow put her grandson, who, by then, had taken up the Flash mantle, out of commission for a week to protect him from a future she is determined to change; however, her plan is corrupted by Bart's clone "brother" Inertia and a weakened Bart is beaten to death by the Rogues.

In Final Crisis: Rogues' Revenge #1, Iris has since moved to her old home in Central City where she is seen tearfully looking over photographs of her late husband, when a disembodied voice calls her name: her late husband, Barry Allen. Iris spends some time as part of a Darkseid-resistance cell operating out of the Hall of Justice alongside Black Lightning, Green Arrow, the Ray, Linda Park and her two children. Soon after, Iris is corrupted by the Anti-Life Equation but Barry is able to break its hold over her by kissing her & enveloping her in the Speed Force. Iris starts crying at the sight of Barry, who reassures her everything will be okay.

After the return of her husband, Iris is shown fully returning to her life alongside the rest of the Flash family. Still overjoyed by the return of Barry, she does not get much time to spend with him, as Barry is still mentally scarred from his deathly ordeal and staunchly refuses to stop and enjoy even a moment of "normal" life. She is also shown to be much younger than she previously had appeared (she was depicted as a middle-age woman after the events of Crisis), about the same age as when Barry first met her. It is later implied by the resurrected Professor Zoom that Iris's rejuvenation is a side effect of close contact to her husband's Speed Force since Final Crisis. She resumes her career as a crime reporter at Central City.

The New 52
In September 2011, The New 52 rebooted DC's continuity. In this new timeline, Iris is not married to Barry, but they still know each other because of their respective occupations. It is hinted that Iris has a romantic attraction to Barry. She is accidentally trapped in the Speed Force by Turbine, but is freed by Barry's alter-ego. Later issues confirm that she is in love with Barry. Barry does not yet reciprocate Iris' affections, though he hints at it when he's forced to take on the role of the Black Racer and goes to Iris for help.

DC Rebirth
During the DC Rebirth events, when Iris and Wally West II were attacked by Eobard Thawne, Iris had glimpses of her pre-Flashpoint life with Barry, including them as husband and wife and had a family in the other timeline, and learning that he is the Flash in the process. Knowing that Barry is indirectly responsible for the alteration of their lives through time-travel and kept it a secret from her, Iris now distrusts Barry. She also kills Thawne after he lost his powers in retaliation of him hurting Wally II after Barry rescued them, though Thawne later again resurrected from his death. She later appears at the cemetery where Barry asks her for her forgiveness for lying to her. She forgives him, because she is curious about the Flash. He takes her to the Watchtower. She is interested in other secrets Barry is keeping from her. 

Since the Flash Family defeated Grodd and stop the Negative Speed Force from spreading Central City, both she and Barry have rekindled their romances with each other. She is subsequently re-introduced to the pre-Flashpoint Wally West, swiftly regaining her memories of him when she sees him, simultaneously inspiring Wally's own memories of those he has forgotten. She is later brought to trial in the 25th century for Eobard Thawne's murder. She and Barry later have Wally to be taken care of in the rehabilitation center called the Sanctuary, in which she is so happy about Wally being a better hero today. During her romance with Barry, she begins to remember their marriage, and beginning to put pieces together about the new forces that appear in Central City.

Other versions

The New Frontier
In The New Frontier universe, Iris West is a reporter and engaged to crime forensic Barry Allen. During the Cold War and the rise of McCarthyism, Iris wrote her article "Washington Declares War On Mystery Men" on the current events following the death of Hourman and the social bias against masked vigilantes. In 1957, Iris was interviewing Ted "Wildcat" Grant in Las Vegas. While on a phone call with Barry Allen, Captain Cold appeared and froze Iris's hand that was on the phone. Barry heard everything that happened and traveled to Las Vegas as The Flash. In the process he freed an unconscious Iris and stopped Captain Cold. A year later in 1958, after Barry had retired from crime fighting and the subsequent appearance of the Centre, Iris had known for some time that her husband was the Flash and did not reveal this until she convinced him to become a hero once again.

Amalgam Comics
In the Amalgam universe, Iris was combined with Marvel's Roxanne Simpson to form Iris Simpson. When Iris became married to Blaze Allen, her life and soul were taken by the Night Spectre, which threw Blaze into a depression until he bonded with the demon Etrigan to become Speed Demon. Her soul was eventually freed by Blaze and her nephew Wally, who became the third Speed Demon.

Flashpoint
In the Flashpoint miniseries (an event prior to the New 52 relaunch, when an alternate timeline was created by the Flash), Iris West is unmarried and in a relationship with someone called "John" at the Central City Citizen, where she works. Later Iris is seen with her nephew and cameraman, Wally West, covering a battle between Citizen Cold and Mister Freeze. Iris was invited to dinner by Citizen Cold. When she asks him for an interview, he is interrupted by his emergency calls. Later, Citizen Cold is injured during his battle with the Rogues and while collapsing in his car, confronts Iris. Iris then brings him to her home. After he recovers, he gives her a key to his penthouse, and an offer to join him when he leaves Central City. When Citizen Cold returns home, Iris learns from Pied Piper, that Citizen Cold is a criminal and murdered her nephew. Citizen Cold attacks Pied Piper, but Iris uses one of his own weapons to freeze him in a block of ice, just as he had Wally. Afterwards, Iris visits her nephew's grave along with her husband John.

Injustice: Gods Among Us
In the Injustice: Gods Among Us prequel series, Barry met with Iris sometime after Superman killed the Joker where she expressed her disapproval of Superman's actions. She's convinced that Flash would not do the same if he was in Superman's scenario (where Iris would be murdered instead of Lois), and tells Barry to not condone Superman's actions and to promise her that he will stand up to Superman if he goes down the wrong path. Five years later, Barry goes to see Iris after Superman lashes out at him for letting Batman get away, where it's shown that they've broken up as Iris is upset with Barry for breaking his promise and supporting Superman. Later, Flash sees Iris being arrested by Girder and King Shark for treason against the Regime from joining a Central City Insurgent group. Flash tries to defend them from the two villains and ends up killing King Shark in the process. Iris is disgusted by Barry's actions and offers to arrest herself just to not deal with Barry. Barry talks with her, and she tells him that her faith in him was shattered five years ago when she was undercover in Australia where she witnessed Superman and Wonder Woman brutally beat and cripple a rebellious hero named Galaxor while Flash did nothing to help the young man (who committed suicide shortly afterwards though that later turns out to be a myth). Iris ultimately rejects Barry and tells him that he's not the man she thought he was. Iris and the rest of her group afterwards are arrested by Flash and Girder, and was set to stand trial for her actions.

In other media

Television
 Iris West appears in The Flash (1990), portrayed by Paula Marshall. This version is a computer graphic artist.
 Iris West appears in Young Justice, voiced by Nicole Dubuc. In "Downtime", she and Barry are shown attending Jay Garrick's birthday party with Wally West. In "Failsafe", Iris was reporting on an alien invasion before being killed. The entire situation is later revealed to be part of Martian Manhunter's mind-training exercise. During "Coldhearted" Iris gives a shout out to Wally on the news as a birthday present before reporting school closings. She later reports Queen Perdita's death on the news although this was revealed to be staged to trick Count Vertigo into admitting to attempted murder of his niece Queen Perdita. In the episode "Bloodlines", she is revealed to be pregnant with twins. Her time-traveling grandson Bart Allen tells her that her unborn son will grow up to be his father. In Young Justice: Outsiders, she is irritated that people have forgotten she is a reporter ever since she has given birth to the twins. In "Home Fires", she hosts a play date for all the children of all the heroes who have families, accompanied by their parents (including Mera, Lois Lane, Will Harper, and John Smith).
 Iris West appears in The Flash (2014), portrayed by Candice Patton. This is the first live-action version of Iris to be portrayed as African-American, a trait which other portrayals of the character would adopt. Iris is Detective Joe West's daughter and Barry Allen's childhood friend, later his fiancé, as of the crossover event entitled "Crisis on Earth X", she marries Barry and becomes his wife. Her Earth-2 counterpart is introduced in "Welcome to Earth-2". In this universe, Iris is a police detective and is married to the Earth-2 Barry; her father, Joe, is a nightclub singer. Iris is first mentioned in the Arrow episode "The Man Under the Hood" as regularly visiting Barry in his coma.

Film
 Iris West appears im Justice League: The New Frontier, voiced by Vicki Lewis. Here, she is also portrayed as the girlfriend of Barry Allen and having deduced his identity too.
 Iris West appears in Justice League: The Flashpoint Paradox, voiced by Jennifer Hale. In an alternate timeline created accidentally by Flash/Barry Allen, she is no longer married to Barry and instead married and had a child with someone else. In contrast with the comic book source material, Barry's marriage to Iris is restored in the film's conclusion based on the story.
 Iris West appears in Justice Society: World War II, voiced by Ashleigh LaThrop. Just like Candice Patton and Kiersey Clemons, she is portrayed as an African American woman. In the beginning of the film, on Earth-1, She and Barry Allen were vacationing in Metropolis for a picnic date in the park. Barry was hoping to see Superman fly by in the sky and Barry running back and forth from Metropolis to Central City getting things he forgot to bring to the picnic, but she questions why they are here and wasn't the main reason for their date was to get away from "work" especially "superhero work". She also questions of their relationships future and where is it going. Their conversation was interrupted when Superman was battling Brainiac and Barry donned his Flash costume and came to his aid. In the end of the film, after Barry and Superman defeated Brainiac and suggest they form a team of heroes, after being inspired by the Justice Society of America of Earth-2, to combat future threats and heeding the words of Earth-2 Wonder Woman about don't wait for what the future may hold, Barry explains everything to Iris and then proposes to her. She accepts and they kiss.

DC Extended Universe
Kiersey Clemons was cast as Iris West in Justice League, though her scenes were cut. Her scenes were later restored in the director's cut Zack Snyder's Justice League, in which Barry Allen uses his speed to save her from a traffic accident. She is slated to appear in the upcoming film The Flash (2023), which is a part of the DC Extended Universe.

Novels
Iris Allen is featured in the Justice League novel Flash: Stop Motion written by Mark Shultz.

References

DC Comics female characters
Comics characters introduced in 1956
DC Comics metahumans
Fictional reporters
Fictional writers
Fictional photographers
Characters created by Carmine Infantino
Characters created by Joe Kubert
Characters created by Robert Kanigher
Flash (comics) characters